Cash Crop is an album by the Canadian hip hop group Rascalz, released in 1997 on ViK. Recordings. The album is the group's most successful record to date and was certified gold by CRIA with sales of over 50,000 copies across Canada.

Northern Touch 
The album's most notable track, "Northern Touch", was not on the original 1997 pressing of the album, but was released as a one-off non-album single in 1998. After it unexpectedly became one of the biggest hit songs in the history of Canadian hip hop, it was added to later pressings of the album.

Juno Award 
Cash Crop was named the winner of the Juno Award for Best Rap Recording at the Juno Awards of 1998. However, the award was presented during the non-televised portion of the ceremony along with the technical awards, rather than at the televised main ceremony. Alleging that racism was a factor in the award's scheduling,  the band refused to accept the award. Speaking to the press afterward, the group and their co-manager said that

Track listing 

 "Temptation"
 "Solitaire Remix"
 "Dreaded Fist"
 "Soul Obligation"
 "Clockwork"
 "Anatomy"
 "Way With Words"
 "Fitnredi"
 "Strange Brew"
 "No Idea"
 "Chat Bout"
 "Mood Swings"
 "Blind Wid the Science"
 "Shock Therapy"
 "Shouts"
 "Solitaire"
 "Outro"
 "Northern Touch" (featuring Checkmate, Kardinal Offishall, Thrust, and Choclair)

Charts

References 

1997 albums
Rascalz albums